Monje may refer to:

Jose Monje Cruz (1950–1992), known as Camarón de la Isla, Spanish flamenco romani singer
Juan Andrés Rodríguez (El Monje) (born 1930), Cuban artist specializing in painting and drawing
Fernando Álvarez Monje (born 1968), Mexican politician affiliated with the National Action Party
Fernando Monje (born 1993), Spanish racing driver who competes in the World Touring Car Championship
Gustavo Monje (born 1971), Argentine stage actor and director
Jonathan Monje (born 1981), Chilean long-distance runner
José Malcampo y Monje, 3rd Marquis of San Rafael (1828–1880), Spanish noble, admiral and politician
Julieta Mabel Monje, Bolivian politician and lawyer
Leonardo Monje (born 1981), Chilean retired footballer
Mario Monje, the Secretary-General of the PCB, the Communist Party of Bolivia
Tomás Monje (1884–1954), 48th President of Bolivia between August 1946 and March 1947
Vicente Monje (born 1981), Argentinian footballer who last played for Central Norte
Monje de Montaudo (1193–1210), born Pèire de Vic, a nobleman, monk, and troubadour from the Auvergne
Carlos Monje Serrano (born 1990), commonly known as Chirri, Spanish footballer

See also
El monje blanco, a 1945 Mexican historical drama film
Paul Monje House, historic home located at Washington, Franklin County, Missouri
SNGC Colonel Alfonso Monje (82-1), 82-foot Point class cutter constructed at Curtis Bay, Maryland in 1960
Monj (disambiguation)
Monjvek
Mošnje

es:Monje
nl:Monje